Earl of Liverpool is a title that has been created twice in British history.  The first time was in the Peerage of Great Britain in 1796 for Charles Jenkinson, 1st Baron Hawkesbury, a favourite of King George III (see Jenkinson baronets for earlier history of the family). He had already been made Baron Hawkesbury, of Hawkesbury in the County of Gloucester, in 1786, and succeeded as the seventh Baronet of Walcot and Hawkesbury in 1790. His eldest son, the second Earl, served as Prime Minister of the United Kingdom from 1812 to 1827. The peerages became extinct in 1851 on the death of the latter's half-brother, the third Earl, while the baronetcy was inherited by a cousin (see Jenkinson baronets).

The earldom was revived in 1905 in favour of the Liberal politician Cecil Foljambe, 1st Baron Hawkesbury, son of George Foljambe and his second wife Lady Selina Charlotte Jenkinson, daughter of the third Earl of the first creation. He was made Viscount Hawkesbury, of Kirkham in the County of York and of Mansfield in the County of Nottingham, at the same time, and had already been created Baron Hawkesbury, of Haselbech in the County of Northampton and of Ollerton, Sherwood Forest, in the County of Nottingham, in 1893. His eldest son, the second Earl, served as Governor-General of New Zealand between 1912 and 1920. , the titles are held by the latter's great-nephew, the fifth Earl, who succeeded his great-uncle, the fifth son of the first Earl, in 1969. He is the posthumous son of Captain Peter George William Savile Foljambe (1919–1944), who was killed in action in the Second World War, son of the Hon. Bertram Marmaduke Osbert Savile Foljambe (1891–1955), sixth son of the first Earl. Lord Liverpool is one of the ninety elected hereditary peers that remain in the House of Lords after the passing of the House of Lords Act 1999, and sits on the Conservative benches.

Family estate and North Yorkshire roles
The 4th Earl was Inspector of Driffield Division of the police's East Riding Special Constabulary, 1926–1945. He was returned by the people to Norton Rural District in Yorkshire from 1927 to 1947. He had his main home published as Inverey, 11 West Park Road, Cupar, Fife, Scotland.

Earl of Liverpool, first creation

Baron Hawkesbury, first creation (1786)

Charles Jenkinson, 1st Baron Hawkesbury (1729–1808) (created Earl of Liverpool in 1796)

Earl of Liverpool (1796)
Charles Jenkinson, 1st Earl of Liverpool (1729–1808)
Robert Banks Jenkinson, 2nd Earl of Liverpool (1770–1828)
Charles Cecil Cope Jenkinson, 3rd Earl of Liverpool (1784–1851)

Earl of Liverpool, second creation

Baron Hawkesbury, second creation (1893)
Cecil George Savile Foljambe, 1st Baron Hawkesbury (1846–1907) (created Earl of Liverpool in 1905)

Earl of Liverpool (1905)
Cecil George Savile Foljambe, 1st Earl of Liverpool (1846–1907)
Arthur William de Brito Savile Foljambe, 2nd Earl of Liverpool (1870–1941)
Gerald William Frederick Savile Foljambe, 3rd Earl of Liverpool (1878–1962)
Robert Anthony Edward St Andrew Savile Foljambe, 4th Earl of Liverpool (1887–1969)
Edward Peter Bertram Savile Foljambe, 5th Earl of Liverpool (b. 1944)

The heir apparent is the present holder's son, Luke Marmaduke Peter Savile Foljambe, Viscount Hawkesbury (b. 1972).
The heir apparent's heir apparent is his son, Hon. Charles Marmaduke Foljambe (b. 2019).

Male-line family tree

See also
Jenkinson baronets, of Walcot and Hawkesbury

References

Extinct earldoms in the Peerage of Great Britain
Earldoms in the Peerage of the United Kingdom
Noble titles created in 1796
Noble titles created in 1905
Noble titles created for UK MPs